Arlindo is a given name. Notable people with the name include:

Arlindo Barbeitos (born 1940), Angolan poet
Arlindo Chinaglia (born 1949), Brazilian politician and former President of the Chamber of Deputies of Brazil 2007–2009
Arlindo Cruz (born 1958), Brazilian musician, composer and singer, working in the genre of samba and pagode
Arlindo Gomes Furtado (born 1949), the Roman Catholic bishop of the Diocese of Mindelo, Cape Verde, from 2003 to 2011
Arlindo Pena Ben-Ben served as the military commander of UNITA in the Angolan Civil War
Arlindo (footballer) (born 1940), Brazilian footballer